NTS Radio (also known as NTS Live or simply NTS) is an online radio station and media platform started in the Hackney area of London. The station was founded in April 2011 by Femi Adeyemi "for an international community of music lovers". NTS broadcasts from its studios in London and Los Angeles, as well as remote worldwide broadcasts from its mix of resident hosts and guests. NTS produces a diverse range of live radio shows, digital media and events.

The Guardian has described NTS as "redefining radio" and The New Yorker described it as a radio "which reshaped how musicians and fans around the world saw and heard one another".

Music Business Worldwide reported in January 2020 that NTS has 1.5 million monthly listeners. By May 2020, the Financial Times reported that NTS had picked up more than 2.5 million unique monthly listeners. The same article reported that "fifty percent of NTS's music cannot be found on Spotify [...] either because it's not available on Spotify yet or because it's a rare undiscovered gem from decades ago".

NTS has permanent studios in London, Manchester and Los Angeles, as well as regular remote broadcasts from around the globe. According to the Institute of Contemporary Arts, "NTS Radio is a family of like-minded and passionate individuals, dedicated to supporting exciting music and culture through online radio and events. NTS uncovers the best of the musical past, celebrates the present and cultivates the future of the underground music scene, and prides itself on being open-minded and experimental".

Origins
The name NTS is an abbreviation for 'Nuts To Soup', which was the name of a previous blog run by Adeyemi.
Adeyemi, who had also been involved in founding Boiler Room, started NTS on a budget of £5,000, inspired by his love of pirate radio, MTV2, US college radio stations like WFMU and the creative community around London nightclub Plastic People (where NTS CEO Sean McAuliffe was a resident). In an interview with Music Business Worldwide in 2020, Adeyemi speaks of starting NTS as a response to a homogenous radio climate; "Pirate radio stations were laser focused on specific sounds and the mainstream radio stations the same... there are so many different tastes in London, why don't we just set up this thing that plays everything? Let's keep it as diverse as possible."

Programming and creative
According to the Financial Times, part of NTS's "success is down to the quality and underground nature of its DJs and live performances". Across NTS two live channels, there are currently over 500 resident artists, music producers, DJs and record collectors globally that make up the regular shows on the platform, most of whom own share options in the company. Regular hosts range from the likes of Sunn O)))'s Stephen O'Malley to The XX's Jamie xx, Yellow Magic Orchestra's Haruomi Hosono, Yaeji, rapper Zack Fox, Show Me the Body, Theo Parrish, Moxie, Four Tet, Mark Leckey, Floating Points, artist Martine Syms, Eclair Fifi, Kelsey Lu, Erol Alkan, Moor Mother, Fenriz, Coby Sey, Smithsonian Folkways, The Numero Group, jazz musician Angel Bat Dawid, and Andrew Weatherall. The NTS breakfast show (broadcast from their London studios) was called The Do!! You!!! Breakfast Show and was presented by Charlie Bones up until August 2021. Bones was often joined by guest hosts and performers. Bones was replaced by NTS hosts Flo Dill and Zakia Sewell.

From these guest shows, many have been used by the hosts as an opportunity to premiere new music, with the following airing their releases as a 'first listen' on NTS before official release; Death Grips, Arca, Flying Lotus, Jeff Mills, Dean Blunt, Nicolas Jaar, Kelela, Autechre, Mount Kimbie and Arthur Russell have all debuted on NTS in recent years.

In late 2018, NTS launched a new feature called 'Infinite Mixtapes' - music-only themed streams without any traditional radio talkover. Originally exclusive to the NTS iOS app, this led to a feature on the Apple Store as 'App Of The Day'  and now accounts for 20% of their overall streaming figures according to Music Business Worldwide.
 
NTS video output in recent years ranges from live sessions with artists, original music videos, and livestreamed video performance.

NTS programmes live events and club nights across the world throughout the year. This is most prominently the case in London, where NTS has been behind a number of debut UK shows.

Notable projects and collaborations
NTS has worked with a variety of collaborating music partners, brands, arts institutions and public bodies. Every month, NTS curates live music experiences at the Tate Lates event series at the Tate Modern gallery in London - an event that is co-sponsored by clothing brand Uniqlo. NTS has an artist development programme called Work In Progress, which aims to take six artists to the next stages of their musical careers. Supported by Carhartt, Work In Progress  is run in partnership with Arts Council England, and attracted over 9,000 applicants in its first year.
 
In April 2018, Autechre announced a four-week residency on NTS that would go on to be the release of their thirteenth album release, NTS Sessions 1–4. It was not made known that the residency would include new material until after the first session was broadcast, leading many to assume that it would be another of the band's extended DJ mixes. A few days after the first session aired, Warp announced that each of the two-hour sessions would be released as a digital download immediately after broadcast, with 12-LP and 8-CD boxed sets of the entire album, as well as 3-LP pressings of each individual session, to be released in July.

NTS launched a capsule clothing collection with Adidas Originals during the summer of 2019, run under the NTS signature tag line of ‘Don't Assume’. The marketing campaign for the collection featured musicians and artists as models, including reggae musician Lee "Scratch" Perry, who was 83-years-old at the time of the photoshoot.

In June 2019, NTS teamed up with independent electronic indie label Warp Records to celebrate their thirtieth anniversary. Over a long weekend, Warp took over both of NTS' live channels, broadcasting over 100 hours of original content from the likes of Boards of Canada, Brian Eno, Flying Lotus, Death Grips, Ryuichi Sakamoto, Kelela and many more. Celebrated New York jazz record label Blue Note also co-programmed a takeover broadcast with NTS in celebration of their 80th anniversary, which featured radio shows hosted by Jeff Garlin, Dr Lonnie Smith and Don Was.

In September 2019 NTS and Netflix devised a two-day series of workshops and panels about getting into the creative industries, directed at 16-25 year olds in London. The event featured director Jenn Nkiru, Skepta manager Grace Ladoja, former NTS presenter Tiffany Calver and rap engineer Sean D, alongside Top Boy actors Ashley Walters and Micheal Ward.

On 19 February 2020, the Venezuelan experimental musician and artist Arca premiered her new 62-minute single @@@@@ via a special NTS radio show entitled DIVA EXPERIMENTAL FM. The release was accompanied by a audiovisual directed by Frederik Heyman, and was then widely released on 21 February by XL Recordings.

On 2 May 2020, NTS announced a 24-hour charity broadcast called Remote Utopias, raising funds for The Global Foodbanking Network. The broadcast brought together musicians, DJs, artists and filmmakers from across the globe to present radio shows and mixes, exclusive premieres, and live video streams. The likes of Erykah Badu and Tame Impala premiered new music, radio shows and mixes came from the likes of Jonah Hill, JME and Jorja Smith, readings came from the likes of Wolfgang Tillmans, and special video performances from Bladee and Ecco2K, Standing on the Corner and Mica Levi (as Therapy Garden).

For their 10th birthday, NTS was curated by 10 special guests across a week of programming. The curators were Simpsons creator Matt Groening, rising Ghanaian alté star Amaarae, My Bloody Valentine, Patia's Fantasy World, Mica Levi, Liz Johnson Artur, Dopplereffekt, Theo Parrish, Laurie Anderson and Arca. Notable guests that those curators selected across the week ranged from Flea from the Red Hot Chili Peppers to Eric Andre, Marshall Allen from Sun Ra Arkestra to ANOHNI.

Notable NTS brand partners have included Netflix, Rockstar Games, SONOS, YouTube Music and Adidas

Awards
NTS won the 2014 Best Online Radio Station in the World Award from Mixcloud and the official International Radio Awards Festival.

In 2018 Femi Adeyemi as founder of NTS Radio won the AIM Independent Music Awards as "Indie Champion" of the year.

In 2019 NTS Radio won the Outstanding Contribution category in DJ Mag's Best of British Awards.

See also
SoundCloud
Mixcloud
Resonance FM
KCRW
Rinse FM
WFMU
Boiler Room
Dublab

References

External links
 

Radio stations in London
Electronic music organizations
Internet radio stations in the United Kingdom
Radio stations established in 2011